Daily Tips for Modern Living is a six-episode comedy television series which aired across Canada in 1998 on CBC Television. Greg Thomey portrayed Ernie Post, a caricature of a  lifestyle program host. The show was conceived as a satire of Martha Stewart Living, with up to six sketches per episode.

The half-hour programs were produced by Salter Street Films in mid-1997 at Halifax, Nova Scotia. Writers for the show were Mark Farrell, Christian Murray, Tim Steeves and Greg Thomey. Matt Gallagher was the series director.

References

External links
 

CBC Television original programming
1998 Canadian television series debuts
1998 Canadian television series endings
1990s Canadian sketch comedy television series